Charles Virgil Ballard (December 18, 1903 – August 23, 1990) was the fifth head coach of the Texas Tech Red Raiders basketball team during the Matador's 1934–35 season. He garnered a 15–9 record, including the team's 100th win, a one-point victory over House of David. Ballard also served as an assistant football coach under Texas Tech head coach Pete Cawthon during the Matador's 1934 season.

References

1903 births
1990 deaths
Stephen F. Austin State University alumni
Texas Tech Red Raiders basketball coaches
Texas Tech Red Raiders football coaches